Lorraine May "Yam" Concepcion-Cuunjieng (born May 27, 1988), is a Filipino actress known for her role in the erotic thriller movie Rigodon directed by Erik Matti, and she rose to fame on the 2013 daytime television series Dugong Buhay alongside Ejay Falcon and Arjo Atayde.

Personal life
She graduated high school at Assumption College San Lorenzo. She finished a degree in Multimedia Arts at College of Saint Benilde.

On June 23, 2021, Yam announced her engagement with boyfriend Miguel Cuunjieng, who is living and working in New York. They got married on July 25, 2021.

Filmography

Television

Films

Music video appearance
 Shopping (Ryan Bang, 2015, also featuring Jayson Gainza, Aiko Climaco, Donnalyn Bartolome, Kristine Santamena and Mayumi Yokoyama)

 Sinungaling (Mayonnaise, 2013)

References

External links
 

1988 births
Filipino child actresses
Filipino film actresses
Living people
Filipino television actresses
Actresses from Metro Manila
People from Quezon City
De La Salle–College of Saint Benilde alumni
Star Magic
Viva Artists Agency
ABS-CBN personalities